The Circuito Internacional de Vila Real is a  temporary street circuit in Vila Real, Portugal. This circuit was used for car and moto races.

The circuit

The circuit layout has suffered several changes through the times. Started as a  street circuit in 1931, it was later reduced to a  version in the 1950s, which lasted until 1991, with small chances in some corner, chicanes introduction and start/finish line being moved forward.

From the original circuit, remains the up and downhill section, from turn 6 (Boque), until turn 19, that drivers used to turn left. This section also gives the track big elevation changes.

It's considered one of the most challenging tracks, due to its corners, high speed and drivers being very close to the barriers.

Lap records

The official race lap records at the Circuito Internacional de Vila Real are listed as:

Winners

Notes

References

External links
 Clube Automóvel de Vila Real
 WTCC Vila Real Official Website

Motorsport venues in Portugal
World Touring Car Championship circuits
Sport in Vila Real